The Paper Mill Village Bridge, also called the Paper Mill Bridge or Bennington Falls Covered Bridge, is a wooden covered bridge that carries Murphy Road across the Walloomsac River northwest of Bennington, Vermont.  Built in 1889, it was listed on the National Register of Historic Places in 1973.

Description and history
The Paper Mill Village Bridge is located adjacent to a former paper mill building, located on the south side of State Route 67A, just south of the campus of Bennington College, northwest of downtown Bennington. It rests on stone abutments that have been partially faced in concrete. The sides are clad in vertical board siding, while the portal ends are finished in horizontal flushboard siding. The side walls only rise part of the way to the roof, which shelters the upper portions of the trusses. A number of the truss members have been doubled to strengthen them, and there are also additional floor beams.

The Paper Mill Bridge was built in 1889 by Charles F. Sears, whose family was prominent in the local bridge-building business. The bridge, which is the longest covered bridge in Bennington County, is similar in design to the nearby Silk Covered Bridge, whose design is sometimes attributed to Sears' father Benjamin.
  It was rebuilt in 2000.

See also 
 List of covered bridges in Vermont
 National Register of Historic Places listings in Bennington County, Vermont
 List of bridges on the National Register of Historic Places in Vermont

References

External links 

Visitor Information: Paper Mill Village Bridge — Bennington Area Chamber of Commerce

Buildings and structures in Bennington, Vermont
Bridges completed in 1889
Covered bridges on the National Register of Historic Places in Vermont
Wooden bridges in Vermont
Bridges in Bennington County, Vermont
Tourist attractions in Bennington County, Vermont
National Register of Historic Places in Bennington County, Vermont
Road bridges on the National Register of Historic Places in Vermont
Lattice truss bridges in the United States
1889 establishments in Vermont